Thubten Jigme Norbu (August 16, 1922 – September 5, 2008), recognised as the Taktser Rinpoche, was a Tibetan lama, writer, civil rights activist and professor of Tibetan studies and was the eldest brother of the 14th Dalai Lama, Tenzin Gyatso. He was one of the first high-profile Tibetans to go into exile and was the first to settle in the United States.

Early life
Thubten Jigme Norbu was born in 1922 in the small, mountain village of Taktser in the Amdo County of Eastern Tibet.

Independence walks

In 1995, Norbu cofounded the International Tibet Independence Movement (ITIM).  He led three walks for Tibet's independence, starting in 1995 with a week-long walk 80 miles from Bloomington, Indiana to Indianapolis, Indiana.  In 1996 he led a 300-mile, 45-day walk from the PRC embassy in Washington, DC to the Headquarters of the United Nations, surrounded by New York City.  The following year, joined by Dadon with her 3-year-old son, he led a 600-mile walk from Toronto to New York City, beginning on March 10 (Tibetan Uprising Day) and ending June 14 (Flag Day).

Life in the US

Norbu lived at the Tibetan-Mongolian Buddhist Cultural Center with his wife Kunyang. They have three sons, Lhundrup, Kunga and Jigme Norbu, all born in New York. In late 2002, Norbu suffered a series of strokes and became an invalid.

Norbu died at the age of 86 on September 5, 2008, at his home in Indiana in the United States having been ill for several years. His body was cremated in a traditional Buddhist ceremony. His youngest son, Jigme, died at the age of 45 on February 14, 2011, while carrying on his father's work. He was hit by a car in Florida during a walk to promote Tibetan independence and raise awareness of Tibet.

Writings
Tibet Is My Country is his autobiography dictated to Heinrich Harrer in 1959, and updated with a new essay in 1987 and 2006
Tibet: Its History, Religion and People, co-written with Colin Turnbull in 1968
Tibet: The Issue Is Independence – Tibetans-in-Exile Address the Key Tibetan Issue the World Avoids is an essay collection from 1994 by Tibetans in the diaspora (mainly Tibetan Americans) and features an introduction by Norbu
Norbu and Robert B. Ekvall provided the first English translation of the Tibetan play originally authored by the fifth Panchen Lama Lobsang Yeshe Younger Brother Don Yod in 1969.

References

External links
Biography
Tibetan Mongolian Buddhist Cultural Center
Taktser Rinpoche, eldest brother of the Dalai Lama, passes away
Reminiscences of Thubten Jigme Norbu by Jamyang Norbu
The Independent: Thubten Jigme Norbu: Activist and Dalai Lama's brother

1922 births
2008 deaths
American civil rights activists
Lamas
American people of Tibetan descent
Indiana University faculty
Tibetan dissidents
Tibetan Buddhism writers
Tibetan Buddhist spiritual teachers
Tibetan Buddhists from Tibet
Tibet freedom activists
Tibetan writers
Rinpoches
Taktser Rinpoches